DinoSquad is an American animated television series that was produced by DIC Entertainment and aired on the KEWLopolis block on CBS from November 3, 2007 – December 6, 2008.

The show was about five teenagers, each with the power to turn into a respective dinosaur. They use this power to fight the evil Victor Veloci, who is intent on returning the world to the age of dinosaurs by turning humans and animals into new mutant dinosaurs and accelerating global warming. The series is also used to help teach viewers about many life lessons, such as how to deal with bullies, the effect humans have on the environment, and responsibility.

This show, along with Sushi Pack, were the final two series produced by DIC before their acquisition with Cookie Jar Entertainment.

Show summary
On a school field trip to the tide pools, five teenagers, Max, Rodger, Caruso, Fiona, and Buzz, leap into the ocean to save a dog, Rump, from a shark attack. However, Victor Veloci, the owner of a biogenetics company called Raptor Dyne and a shapeshifting velociraptor disguised as a human, releases a substance called primordial ooze into the tide pools with the goal of reverting every living thing back to their early evolutions. The ooze mutates the DNA of the five teenagers, giving them the ability to turn into dinosaurs. Their mysterious science teacher, Ms. Moynihan reveals herself as another shapeshifting velociraptor, and telepathically shows the teens that when the asteroid that killed the dinosaurs hit the Earth, she and Victor survived, trapped in a cave. Over Millions of years, their DNA mutated and gave them shapeshifting powers, and they integrated themselves into society, keeping their identities secret. 
Victor Veloci ultimately seeks to take advantage of global warming and return the earth to the Mesozoic era under the belief that dinosaurs are superior. Ms. Moinihan believes that humans are superior because they evolved reason and love rather than brute force and does what she can to hinder Victor from the shadows. Victor seeks to capture the Dino Squad in their dinosaur forms because they are perfectly formed dinosaurs rather than temporary mutations, however, he doesn’t know that they have human forms, and so continuously mutates wild animals to draw them out and try to capture them. Besides their world-saving duties, Max, Rodger, Caruso, Fiona, and Buzz also need to deal with high school and typical teenage drama. Veloci's plans are always thwarted and thus the return to the age of the dinosaurs was not meant to be. Dino Squad is set in Kittery Point, Maine.

Season 2 episodes began airing online on August 4, 2008, before airing on CBS on September 13.

Characters

Dino Squad members
 Ms. Moynihan (Joanne Moynihan) - a science teacher who is a Velociraptor that survived extinction and gained a human form. She can communicate telepathically with the teens.
 Max (Rolf Maxwell) - a hunky, 18-year-old high school senior in Ms. Moynihan's class. He is the team leader and captain of the football team. His Dino form is a green Tyrannosaurus with brown spots (although his dino form has three fingers, unlike the real Tyrannosaurus, which had two). Max is voiced by Ian Eli Lee.
 Roger (Roger Blair) - an African-American high school senior in Ms. Moynihan's class. He is very smart and has a prankster streak. He is able to come up with gadgets even though his creations fail at first. He is somewhat arrogant like Caruso, but always helps the team when duty calls. He has a younger brother named Mikey. His Dino form is referred to as a  Styracosaurus in the series, although it has three horns like a Triceratops unlike the real Styracosaurus which only had one horn on it's nose. Roger is voiced by Kelcey Watson.
 Caruso (Erwin Caruso) - a handsome high school senior in Ms. Moynihan's class. He is vain and obsessed with the idea of fame, as well as his "good looks". He can be a pain sometimes though as his selfishness and arrogance hurt the team. Though he did prove himself worthy to the squad in episode 23. In that same episode he is revealed to have created his own line of moisturizers. He also practices yoga. His Dino form is a dark blue Stegosaurus with brown plates (although his dino form has five tail spikes, sharp teeth and no beak, unlike the real Stegosaurus which, of course, had a beak, flat teeth and four tail spikes). Caruso is voiced by Benjamin Beck.
 Fiona (Fiona Flagstaff) - a Latina high school senior in Ms. Moynihan's class. She is the only female on the Squad (with the exception of Ms. Moynihan), and has a penchant for fast things like rollerblades or race cars. What grosses out Fiona entices Buzz (spiders, insects, etc.). She is allergic to spider bites, as revealed in "Never Judge a Dinosaur by its Cover". Fiona is the squad's resident mechanic and gear head, and is also a tomboy. Max and Buzz may have a crush on her, but she doesn't seem to notice. Her Dino form is a yellow Spinosaurus with a brown sail and orange crest. Fiona has a younger sister named Terri. Fiona is voiced by Dana Donlan.
 Buzz (Neil Buzmati) - another high school senior in Ms. Moynihan's class. He is 17, then turned 18. He is the youngest member of the team. He's the "punk" kid, who is scared of his own shadow. He is an animal lover, as shown several times throughout the series, and especially shows affection for small animals traditionally considered "gross", such as rats, snakes, cockroaches, and spiders. Buzz is anything but a coward when he is needed in action. His alternate form, a lime green Pteranodon with yellow underbelly (although his pterosaur form is portrayed as bipedal, whereas real pterosaurs were quadrupeds especially Pteranodon), is one of the two non-dinosaurs in the Dino Squad.
 Rump is the Dino Squad's mischievous pet bull terrier. He can transform himself into a strange animal that looks like a hybrid between a Gorgonopsid and modern dog. The Dino Squad has not yet determined the species of dinosaur his "dino form" is supposed to be. Rump usually gives Caruso a hard time from when he took his jacket in "The Beginning" as a stray dog, up until the episode "Runaway Ugly" when he ate Caruso's cupcake.

Supporting characters
 Terri - Fiona's redhaired brainy younger sister. At first she is jealous of Fiona. She appears in three episodes ("A Mole Lotta Trouble", "Wannabe", and, "Never Judge a Dinosaur by its Cover"). Although she may be as intellectual as Rodger, she has also exercised substandard judgment. She has white skin unlike her sister and wears blue glasses. Terri is voiced by Sarah Heinke.

One-time characters
 Liam is a student with Asperger syndrome who only appeared in episode 14.
 Mrs. Carrel is Fiona's neighbor who only appeared in episode 19.
 Peter is Veloci's assistant who only appears in the first episode.

Raptor Dyne
 Victor Veloci is the main antagonist of the series and a business magnate who owns Raptor Dyne. He wants to revert Earth back to the way it was millions of years ago in order to facilitate the return of dinosaurs as the dominant species on the planet by using his primordial ooze. He also wants to capture the Dino Squad members as dinosaurs not knowing they are really humans. His dino form is a Velociraptor. He and Ms. Moynihan were the only survivors of the asteroid that wiped out the dinosaurs.
 Henchman: Veloci's goons. They wear dinosaur shaped helmets with faceplates as part of their uniform, and ride dino-themed vehicles. In episode 23, Caruso dresses up as one to fake out Veloci's real henchmen.

Development
The series was first announced as a programme for DIC and CBS' Saturday-morning Cartoon block (which would be named to KEWLopolis later on) in April 2007, under the name of I Was a High School Dinosaur.

Episodes

Season 1: 2007–2008

Season 2: 2008

Broadcast history
The series originally aired on CBS on the KEWLopolis block until being removed during the blocks rebranding to Cookie Jar TV in 2009.

The series later reaired on the Syndicated Cookie Jar Kids Network block, and on This TV's Cookie Jar Toons block from 2011 until the block's end in 2013.

Home media and streaming releases
From April 2009 until July 2010, NCircle Entertainment released 5 DVDs of the series, each containing 3 episodes (except for the last volume, which has 4).

The series was also available to stream on Netflix from September 2014 until January 1, 2018, and is currently available to stream through Kid Genius and CONtv. In Australia, the series is available on Stan.

References

External links
 

2007 American television series debuts
2008 American television series endings
2000s American animated television series
CBS original programming
American children's animated action television series
American children's animated adventure television series
American children's animated education television series
American children's animated fantasy television series
English-language television shows
Television series about shapeshifting
Animated television series about dinosaurs
Teen animated television series
Television series by DIC Entertainment
Television series by DHX Media
Television shows set in Maine